The 1993–94 Israel State Cup (Gvia HaMedina) was the 55th season of Israel's nationwide football cup competition and the 40th after the Israeli Declaration of Independence.

The competition was won by Maccabi Tel Aviv who had beaten Hapoel Tel Aviv 2–0 in the final.

By winning, Maccabi Tel Aviv qualified to the 1994–95 UEFA Cup Winners' Cup, entering in the qualifying round.

Results

Eighth Round

Byes: Hapoel Ashkelon, Hapoel Tayibe.

Round of 16

Quarter-finals

Semi-finals

Final

References
100 Years of Football 1906–2006, Elisha Shohat (Israel), 2006, pp. 292–3
 93/94 season: Maccabi T. A. –Hapoel T.A. (Cup Final) youtube.com
Israel 1993/94 RSSSF

Israel State Cup
State Cup
Israel State Cup seasons